Larry Giammo is the former mayor of Rockville, Maryland. He was first elected on November 6, 2001, and was reelected in 2003 and 2005.  On March 2, 2007, he announced that he would not be seeking a fourth term as mayor in the November 2007 election. He was replaced by Susan Hoffmann in the November 7th election.

Before his election as mayor, he served as a member of the Rockville Planning Commission (1996–2001), and briefly headed Rockville's Town Center Land Use Advisory Committee from December 2000 through May 2001, where he helped to develop a plan for the redevelopment of the commercial center of Rockville. From 1994 through 2001, he worked for the Corporate Leadership Council in Washington, D.C., a program offered by the Corporate Executive Board. Before that, he worked as an associate with Mercer Management Consulting in Washington and in Brisbane, Australia, and as a financial analyst for General Electric Information Services in Rockville and London. From 1982 through 1988, he served with the U.S. Army Reserve as a microwave communications repairman.

Giammo holds a Master of Business Administration from the Tepper School of Business at Carnegie Mellon University. He holds bachelor degrees in Finance and Economics from the University of Maryland.

References

External links
 "Larry Giammo, Mayor." Rockville, Maryland – Official Web Site. Accessed on February 23, 2005.
 "Larry Giammo's Blog."

Mayors of Rockville, Maryland
United States Army soldiers
Tepper School of Business alumni
Living people
Year of birth missing (living people)